Major Without a Deal is the second studio album by American rapper Troy Ave. The album was released on June 5, 2015, by BSB Records and Empire Distribution.

Critical reception

Major Without a Deal received mixed reviews from music critics. At Metacritic, which assigns a normalized rating out of 100 to reviews from critics, the album received an average score of 61, which indicates "generally favorable reviews", based on 5 reviews. Jesse Fairfax of HipHopDX said, "While he maintains a firm grasp on rapping about the intricacies of his criminal past, Major Without A Deal does little to relay his message as one that is absolutely essential. At this rate, Troy is destined to be a niche artist lacking any true star power. Given his limited vision, he mostly speaks to anyone hung up on the notion that Brooklyn’s vacant throne needs an immediate placeholder." Roger Krastz of XXL said, "Overall, Troy Ave continues to show improvement and growth as an MC with his latest project, and his ear for beats and ability to pick out correct guest features for certain tracks will only bring bigger and better things in the future. Major Without A Deal is another step forward for Troy Ave, but it’s also another win for the birthplace of hip-hop."

Track listing

References

2015 albums
Troy Ave albums
Empire Distribution albums